Bartonsville is an unincorporated community located along Opequon Creek in Frederick County, Virginia between Winchester and Stephens City. Bartonsville is on Springdale Road (SR 649) to the west of Valley Pike (US 11). Historically, it has been referred to as Barton's Mill and Bartonville. The area of Bartonsville was first settled by the Hite Family in 1733. During the American Civil War, the village was garrisoned with a small stone fort of unknown location held by the Union Army.

Historic sites 
Springdale (John Hite House) (1753)
Springdale Mill Complex (1788)

References

Unincorporated communities in Frederick County, Virginia
Unincorporated communities in Virginia